Prometejs (English translation: Prometheus) was an organisation of the Latvian diaspora in the interwar Soviet Union. Its members were former Red Latvian riflemen and other Latvian communists and their family members who settled in the USSR after the October Revolution and the Russian Civil War. The organisation was disbanded in the early period of the Great Purge, many of its activists were murdered during the Latvian Operation of the NKVD.

History
The organisation was established in 1924-1925.

Education and communist indoctrination were among the priorities of Prometejs. The organisation maintained a publishing house and printed periodicals and literature predominantly in the Latvian language for urban Latvians as well as for ethnic Latvian settlers living in rural areas. Prometejs was among the largest and most important educational organisations of ethnic minorities in the USSR.

The structure of Prometejs included the following sections:
 Schooling and methodology
 Agriculture
 Music
 Arts
 Latgalian culture
 others

Prometejs published several magazines (including Celtne and Cīņas biedrs) and newspapers (including Komunāru Cīņa and Darbu Bērni). The organisation owned several factories producing stationery in Moscow in Leningrad, a printing house. In Moscow, Prometejs maintained a Latvian kindergarten, owned estates near Moscow, in Skhodnya and Ilyinskoye,

The organisation maintained Latvian theatres in Moscow, Leningrad and Smolensk. The Moscow-baset theatre Skatuve, established in 1932, was recognised as the best ethnic theatre in the USSR in 1933.

Prometejs was disbanned by the Soviet authorities in July 1937 despite attempts to protect the organisation by high-ranking Latvian Soviet officials like Jūlijs Daniševskis (chairman of Prometejs) and Roberts Eidemanis who were eventually themselves arrested and executed.

Notable members
 Jānis Rudzutaks, revolutionary and member of the government of the USSR (honorary member)
 Jēkabs Peterss, revolutionary and one of the founders of the Cheka (honorary member)
 Jukums Vācietis, Red Army commander (honorary member)
 Gustav Klutsis, Soviet Latvian artist

See also
 Latvians in Russia

References

Latvian diaspora
Latvia–Soviet Union relations
1925 establishments in the Soviet Union
Organizations established in 1925